Megalomyrmex miri is a Neotropical species of ants in the subfamily Myrmicinae. Known from Costa Rica. This species is known only from the type specimens and has no biological data. It is extremely similar to M. wettereri in color, size, shape, measurements, and pilosity. It differs in having a complete foraminal carina and some transverse rugosities on the anteroventral petiolar process.

References

Myrmicinae
Insects described in 1990